Hidden Springs is a populated place situated in Coconino County, Arizona, United States, located on U.S. 89 approximately 75 miles north of Flagstaff. The San Juan Southern Paiute Tribe of Arizona is located there.
 	
Prior to 1963, the location was state-owned highway camp.  In 1963, the state leased the land and a church, Hidden Springs Mission was constructed. When the tribe was created in the early 1990s, it considered locating its headquarters there.

References

Populated places in Coconino County, Arizona